Tony Sanders (2 May 1957, in New York City – 11 February 2015) was an American poet.

Life
Born on May 2, 1957 in New York City, he was educated at Phillips Andover Academy, Yale University, The Iowa's Writer's Workshop and University of Houston. Sanders published four collections of poetry, including the collection of prose poems Subject Matters, and a collaboration of verse with his dear friend and fellow poet Chard deNiord. Sanders' poetry appeared in numerous publications including Poetry, Paris Review, The Yale Review, The Gettysburg Review and The New York Times Book Review. Ten of his poems were nominated for Pushcart Prizes.

He lived in New York City and Vermont. Sanders was a member of The National Arts Club and Poets House.

Awards
 1992 Bernard F. Connors Prize for Poetry

Works

Anthologies

References

1957 births
Living people
American male poets